Roope Ahonen (born 12 June 1990) is a Finnish basketball player for Leche Río Breogán of the LEB Oro and for the Finland national basketball team.

Professional career
In the season 2014–2015 Ahonen played in the VTB with Bisons Loimaa, averaging 9.8 points and 2.7 assists per game.

On 1 September 2017 he signed with Ourense of the LEB Oro. On 22 July 2018 he signed with Liberbank Oviedo Baloncesto of the LEB Oro.

References

External links
 Player profile at official national team site

1990 births
Living people
Bisons Loimaa players
Borås Basket players
CB Breogán players
Club Ourense Baloncesto players
Finnish expatriate basketball people in Spain
Finnish men's basketball players
Kolossos Rodou B.C. players
Oviedo CB players
Point guards
People from Salo, Finland
Solna Vikings players
Torpan Pojat players
Sportspeople from Southwest Finland